Whitsunday Coast Airport , also known as Proserpine Airport, is located in Gunyarra, Whitsunday Region, Queensland, Australia,  south of Proserpine. The airport serves the mainland and offshore islands with flights to Brisbane (Alliance Airlines, Jetstar Airways, Virgin Australia), Sydney and Melbourne (Jetstar Airways).

In the year ending 30 June 2014, the airport handled 282,000 passengers. It is expected that by 2035 the airport will be handling in excess of 900,000 passengers.

History
Plans to build an airfield in Proserpine commenced in 1936, however construction was delayed due to a lack of funding. Construction of the airport finally began in 1950. The aerodrome was officially opened on Saturday 3 November 1951.

In September 2001, the airport suffered heavily from the collapse of Ansett Australia, who at the time were the biggest operator out of Proserpine with direct services to Brisbane, Sydney and Melbourne. It also operated seasonal flights to the Gold Coast and Adelaide.

The airport underwent an upgrade in 2010. The upgraded terminal was officially opened on 20 December 2011.

In January 2014, Whitsunday Regional Council announced it was to discuss with the Government of Queensland the process for designating the airport precinct a PDA (Priority Development Area). This would make the future process of extending the runway the relatively short distance required to receive international services easier and to alleviate the industrial land crisis that has been affecting the Whitsunday Region for many years.

In February 2022, Bonza announced that the airport would become one of its 17 destinations with the airline planning to fly to the Sunshine Coast, Newcastle and Toowoomba Wellcamp from Proserpine

Airlines and destinations

Public Transport
Whitsunday Transit operate bus services from the airport.

Accidents and incidents
 On 9 August 1981 a Cessna 210 departed the airport for Bankstown Airport in Sydney. The plane disappeared over the Barrington Tops in NSW and has never been located (see 1981 Barrington Tops Cessna 210 disappearance).
 On 2 April 2009 a Robinson R22 helicopter piloted by a 36-year-old man conducting training of a 26-year-old passenger crashed, the older man sustained head injuries.

References

External links

Dick Smith safety report on Proserpine Tower
Department of Infrastructure and Planning - Whitsunday Coast Airport terminal upgrade

Airports established in 1946
Airports in Queensland
Whitsunday Region
1946 establishments in Australia
Proserpine, Queensland